The Heir of the Ages is a 1917 American drama silent film directed by Edward LeSaint and written by William Addison Lathrop. The film stars House Peters, Sr., Eugene Pallette, Nina Byron, John Burton, Henry A. Barrows and Adele Farrington. The film was released on June 21, 1917, by Paramount Pictures.

Plot

Cast 
House Peters, Sr. as Hugh Payne
Eugene Pallette as Larry Payne
Nina Byron as Abby Hope
John Burton as Mr. Hope
Henry A. Barrows as Kearney
Adele Farrington as The Duchess

References

External links 
 

1917 films
1910s English-language films
Silent American drama films
1917 drama films
Paramount Pictures films
Films directed by Edward LeSaint
American black-and-white films
American silent feature films
1910s American films